Paisaje is an unincorporated community in Conejos County, in the U.S. state of Colorado.

History
A post office called Paisaje was established in 1906, and remained in operation until 1920.  Paisaje is a name derived from Spanish meaning "pretty place".

References

Unincorporated communities in Conejos County, Colorado
Unincorporated communities in Colorado